The Battle for Qurah and Umm al Maradim, were several naval and land battles for control over the islands off the coast of Kuwait in the Persian Gulf, mainly the islands of Qurah and Umm al Maradim.

Qurah
Qurah was the first island to be retaken by Coalition Forces. On 24 January, two A-6's destroyed an enemy minelayer, a minesweeper, and a patrol boat near Qurah Island. A second minesweeper was sunk when it ran into one of their own mines, trying to evade the A-6s. Helicopters from  flew over the wreckage to pick up Iraqi survivors and take them back as POWs. As they picked up the survivors, Iraqi troops on Qurah fired at the helicopters forcing them to fall back, managing to get twenty-two survivors out of the water. USS Curts maneuvered itself in a position so that it could fire on the island's defenses. This started a six-hour battle to retake the first parcel of Kuwaiti Territory.  landed United States Navy SEALs on the island via helicopter, and by the time the gunfire had ceased, three Iraqi soldiers lay dead with fifty-one surrendering. There were no Coalition losses.

Umm al Maradim
United States Marines assaulted the 300-meter by 400-metre island 12 miles off the Kuwaiti coast using embarked Marine helicopter. After several hours of intense combat, the marines succeeded in liberating the second Kuwaiti island. After destroying Iraqi anti-aircraft weapons and artillery stored on the island, which had been used as an early warning post by the enemy, the Marines raised the Kuwaiti flag over the second parcel of reclaimed territory.

References

Qurah and Umm al Maradim
Qurah and Umm al Maradim
Qurah and Umm al Maradim
Maritime incidents in 1991
January 1991 events in Asia